Pliciloricus enigmaticus is a marine Loriciferan species of genus Pliciloricus first described by Higgins & Kristensen 1986.

Description  

Pliciloricus enigmaticus is a marine species in which adults measure between 160–268 µm of length (excluding any cone mouth).

The body is dual compound, located in the second row spinoscalids in position medioventral and lies fused in the middle of its length basal. It usually is very modified, strongly sclerotised, and rigid. The 15 spinoscalids have claws in the third row. Spinoscalids with 4–7 teeth that alternate with spinoscalids that are not modified.

The Lorica features 7 ridges cuticular transverse and longitudinal ridges doubles, 2 plates lateroventral of the caudal region. The anus is terminal.

Distribution 
The species name Pliciloricus enigmaticus has so far only been used for animals found in the northwestern Atlantic Ocean: Two finds off the eastern shore of North America (see map, right).

See also 
 family Pliciloricidae
 phylum Loricifera

References

External links 
 
 
 
 
 
 

Loricifera
Animals described in 1986